Joseph or Joe Barr may refer to:

Joseph M. Barr (1906–1982), Mayor of Pittsburgh
Joseph W. Barr (1918–1996), U.S. Secretary of the Treasury
Joe Barr (1944–2008), American editor and writer for the SourceForge sites, Linux.com, and the IT Managers Journal
Joe Barr (footballer) (1868–1894), Scottish soccer player